The Nodugl tree frog (Litoria micromembrana) is a species of frog in the subfamily Pelodryadinae.
It is found in New Guinea.

Habitat
Its natural habitats are subtropical or tropical moist montane forests, rivers, and heavily degraded former forests.

In the Upper Kaironk Valley of Madang Province, Papua New Guinea, it is frequently found among Miscanthus cane.

References

micromembrana
Amphibians of New Guinea
Taxonomy articles created by Polbot
Amphibians described in 1963